Promachus yesonicus, or  in Japanese, is a species of robber flies. In Japanese, "shioya" means a salt merchant (someone who makes or deals in salt), and "abu" means a horse-fly. This insect is called "shioya-abu" because the males have a white tip to their tail that resembles salt.

Distribution
Promachus yesonicus is found throughout Japan from Hokkaido to Okinawa. They are visible from June to September.

Description
Male Promachus yesonicus have a white cotton-like bud at the end of their tails, while females do not. Adults can reach  in length.

References

Asilidae
Insects described in 1887
Articles containing video clips
Insects of Japan